Knetsch v. United States, 364 U.S. 361 (1960), was a decision by the United States Supreme Court concerning taxation law.

The taxpayer was a saver who was convinced to buy a deferred annuity because the inside buildup on such policies is tax-deferred. However, he wanted to claim a deduction on the money he borrowed that he used to buy the annuity. The IRS won and the taxpayer was denied the deduction. An understanding of the economics would immediately reveal that the only reason the transaction had any chance of making sense for the taxpayer was the asymmetric way the-then current tax code allowed a current deduction on the loan liability at the same time allowed tax deferral on the purchased asset. Success would have legitimated tax arbitrage.

See also
List of United States Supreme Court cases, volume 364

Further reading

External links

United States Supreme Court cases
United States Supreme Court cases of the Warren Court
United States taxation and revenue case law
1960 in United States case law